Muar River (Rio Muar) is a stream in Sofala province of Mozambique.

See also
 List of rivers of Mozambique

References

Rivers of Mozambique